Mickey's Christmas Carol is a 1983 American animated Christmas fantasy featurette  directed and produced by Burny Mattinson. The cartoon is an adaptation of Charles Dickens's 1843 novella A Christmas Carol, and stars Scrooge McDuck as Ebenezer Scrooge. Many other Disney characters, primarily from the Mickey Mouse universe, as well as Jiminy Cricket from Pinocchio (1940), and characters from The Adventures of Ichabod and Mr. Toad (1949) and Robin Hood (1973), were cast throughout the film. The featurette was produced by Walt Disney Productions and released by Buena Vista Distribution on 16 December 1983, with the re-issue of The Rescuers (1977). In the United States, it was first aired on television on NBC, on 10 December 1984.

Mickey's Christmas Carol was largely adapted from the 1974 Disneyland Records audio musical An Adaptation of Dickens' Christmas Carol. The musical featured similar dialogue and a similar cast of characters. 

The film was nominated for an Academy Award for Best Animated Short Film in 1984, but lost to Jimmy Picker's Sundae in New York. It was the first nomination for a Mickey Mouse short since Mickey and the Seal (1948).

Plot

On Christmas Eve in 19th-century London, surly money-lender Ebenezer Scrooge (played by Scrooge McDuck) objects to the merriment of Christmas. He refuses to give money to a panhandler outside his office, declines his nephew Fred (Donald Duck)'s invitation to Christmas dinner, and dismisses two gentlemen (Rat and Mole) fundraising aid for the poor. His overworked, underpaid employee, Bob Cratchit (Mickey Mouse), who Scrooge pays just a little extra to do his laundry, requests to have half of Christmas Day off, to which Scrooge reluctantly accepts on the condition that Cratchit is docked half a day's pay. Scrooge continues his business and goes home. As he enters his house, Scrooge is visited by the ghost of his old partner Jacob Marley (Goofy). Jacob informs Scrooge that as punishment for his greedy ways, he is condemned in the afterlife to carry long and heavy chains, and warns that the same thing will happen to Scrooge if he doesn't change his own ways before his death, making the old miser frightened and beg for help. Before leaving, Marley then tells Scrooge that he will be visited by three more spirits in the night and that he should listen to them and do what they say, lest his chains become heavier than Marley's.

At one o'clock, Scrooge is visited by the Ghost of Christmas Past (Jiminy Cricket), who takes him back in time to his early adult life. They visit his time as an employee under the kind Fezziwig (Mr. Toad). They see Fezziwig throws a Christmas party where the young Scrooge meets a young woman named Isabelle (Daisy Duck), whom he falls in love with. However, the Ghost shows Scrooge how over time, he came to love money more than Isabelle and as a result, Isabelle left him. A distraught Scrooge asks the Ghost to return him to the present, and the Ghost grants his request, but reminds him that he created this past himself. As Scrooge laments over his past actions, he is then visited the gigantic, merry Ghost of Christmas Present (Willie the Giant). The Ghost takes Scrooge to Bob Cratchit's house. Scrooge sees that their Christmas dinner for their family of five consists of barely enough food to feed one person, and becomes especially concerned when he sees Bob's ill son Tiny Tim (played by Morty Mouse). The Ghost hints that if things don't change for the family, Tiny Tim will die and then disappears, leaving a distraught Scrooge begging for clarification.

Scrooge is then suddenly transported to a cemetery, where he meets the Ghost of Christmas Future, who initially appears as a silent, cloaked, cigar-smoking figure. When Scrooge inquires about Tiny Tim, the Ghost points to Bob and his family mourning at Tiny Tim's grave. As a devastated Scrooge asks if this event can be changed, he sees two gravediggers (Weasels) who are amused that no one attended the funeral of the man they are burying. As the gravediggers leave to rest, Scrooge asks the ghost who the grave belongs to. The Ghost reveals the tombstone bearing none other than Scrooge’s name and, after revealing his own identity (Pete), shoves him into the grave, where his empty coffin opens to reveal the flames of Hell. The terrified Scrooge vows to change his ways once and for all as he falls into the coffin, only to find himself in his bedroom on Christmas Day.

Gleeful that the spirits gave him a second chance, he makes plans to do good to all the people he had been selfish with. He decides to surprise Bob's family with a turkey dinner and Christmas toys and ventures out to spread happiness and joy around London. He donates a sizable amount of money to the gentlemen he earlier spurned and accepts Fred's invitation to Christmas Dinner and then goes to the Cratchit house. At first, putting on a stern demeanor, Scrooge reveals he brought food and gifts for them and intends on raising Bob's salary and making him his partner in his counting house. Scrooge and the Cratchits happily celebrate Christmas.

Cast

Main cast

Extras

Opening street scene
The Big Bad Wolf, collecting for charity (voiced by Will Ryan)
The Three Little Pigs, caroling

Party at Fezzywig's
Lady Kluck, dancing with Secretary Bird
Rabbit children, clapping
Uncle Waldo; clapping, later dancing
Grandma Duck; clapping, later dancing
Horace Horsecollar, dancing with Clarabelle Cow
Gus Goose, dancing with Clara Cluck
Angus MacBadger, dancing
Chip and Dale, dancing
Cocky Locky, dancing
Huey, Dewey, and Louie, decorating Christmas tree
Percy and Patricia Pigg, dancing

Closing street scene
Skippy Bunny and Toby Turtle, playing in the street
Mother Rabbit and Grandma Owl, standing in the street
Practical Pig, chasing two of the Three Little Wolves
Cyril Proudbottom, pulling Donald's cart

The film also includes unidentifiable dog, fox, pig, squirrel, bear, raccoon, goose, and chicken characters. The DVD print reveals that the graveyard scene also includes tombstones containing famous performers, including Gladys Knight and The Pips, Bob Mills, and Warren Oates.

Production
This was the first original Mickey Mouse theatrical cartoon produced in over 30 years. With the exception of re-releases, Mickey had not appeared in movie theaters since the short film The Simple Things (1953). The graveyard sequence was also the first time Disney tested the animation photo transfer process. Many additional characters seen in the film had also not appeared in a theatrical cartoon for several decades such as Horace Horsecollar and Clarabelle Cow. The film was also one of the final times Clarence Nash voiced Donald Duck before his death in 1985. Nash was the only original voice actor in the film as Walt Disney (Mickey Mouse) and Pinto Colvig (Goofy) had died in the 1960s, Bill Thompson (Scrooge McDuck), Cliff Edwards (Jiminy Cricket) and Billy Gilbert (Willie the Giant) in 1971, and Billy Bletcher (Pete and the Big Bad Wolf) in 1979. It also marked the first time in animation that Scrooge McDuck was voiced by actor Alan Young (who had first voiced the character on the musical album); Young would continue to be the primary voice actor for McDuck, most notably in DuckTales, until the actor's death in 2016.

Reception
On review aggregator website Rotten Tomatoes, the film holds a 100% approval rating with an average rating of 8/10 based on 8 reviews.

Film critic Leonard Maltin said that rather than being “a pale attempt to imitate the past”, the film is “cleverly written, well-staged, and animated with real spirit and a sense of fun.” Robin Allan stated that the film calls to mind the similarities between Walt Disney and Charles Dickens, in terms of both the work they produced and their work ethic.

However, Gene Siskel and Roger Ebert of At the Movies gave it “two thumbs down” as they were both disappointed. Siskel felt there was not enough emphasis on Mickey's character, in spite of the title, and that it did not rank with most of Disney's full-length animated features. Ebert stated that it lacked the magic of visual animation that the “Disney people are famous for” and that it was a “forced march” through the Charles Dickens story without any ironic spin.

Mickey's Christmas Carol was nominated for an Academy Award as Best Animated Short Subject of 1983.

Colin Greenland reviewed Mickey's Christmas Carol for Imagine magazine, and stated that "it is surprising how entertaining this is, perhaps because it is actually a Scrooge McDuck movie (of course), with the effete rodent very much in a minor role as Bob Cratchit."

Releases

Mickey's Christmas Carol premiered in the UK on October 20, 1983, alongside a re-issue of The Jungle Book (1967), and was released in the US on December 16, 1983, with a Christmas 1983 re-issue of The Rescuers (1977). It has been broadcast on various television stations throughout the years. It started on NBC (1984–1990) with 12 new additional sepia title cards illustrated by Michael Peraza Jr. to match the 12 he had done for the original film to help bridge the segments together. It went on to air on The Disney Channel (1987–1999; 2002–2006), and CBS (1991–1998), occasionally on ABC (2000)  before moving permanently to ABC Family (2001–). It was aired on Toon Disney in 2008. The run on ABC Family includes Winnie the Pooh and Christmas Too and was part of their "25 Days of Christmas", but with several abrupt edits including the "Chocolate Pot Roast with Yogurt" line and Marley tripping on the stairs and falling down, letting out a Goofy holler.
In Canada, it airs on CBC, and has been aired every Christmas season since 1985. It typically airs the Sunday before Christmas. For many years, the short film would air on CBC as a one-hour program, as mentioned below. In addition, Mickey's Christmas Carol would be shown unmatted. In recent years, however, Mickey's Christmas Carol is only aired in a half-hour time slot and in high definition matted widescreen, presumably to be more suited for modern television screens.

The aforementioned broadcasts in the 1980s and early 1990s spanned a full hour, with the first half consisting of the following older cartoon shorts: Donald's Snow Fight, Pluto's Christmas Tree, and The Art of Skiing.  Each of the four items in the program was preceded by a narrative wraparound segment in which one of the Disney cartoon characters (Donald, Pluto (with Mickey translating), Goofy, and Mickey, respectively) would talk about his favorite Christmas, thus leading into the cartoon in question.  From 1988 onwards, The Art of Skiing was excluded from the annual broadcast, replaced at the end of the hour by one segment or another.  The 1993 telecast, for example, featured a behind-the-scenes featurette on The Nightmare Before Christmas.  Later broadcasts simply reduced the timeslot to half an hour, showing Mickey's Christmas Carol by itself.

A clip of this film in Swedish was shown on Donald Duck's 50th Birthday to illustrate Donald's international appeal.

This short film was featured in Disney's Magical Mirror Starring Mickey Mouse. The shot of Mickey holding Tiny Tim's crutch is also seen in the opening of Epic Mickey.

Home media
The short was released several times on VHS and LaserDisc throughout the 1980s and 1990s. It was released in the Mini-Classics line on September 28, 1989, September 25, 1990 and October 1, 1993. It was re-issued in the Favorite Stories line on October 2, 1996. Some releases featured The Making of "Mickey's Christmas Carol" as a bonus.

The short is also featured, without its opening credits, in the direct-to-home release, Mickey's Magical Christmas: Snowed in at the House of Mouse. It is also available on the ninth volume of the Walt Disney Classic Cartoon Favorites DVD collection, as well as in the Walt Disney Treasures set Mickey Mouse in Living Color – Volume 2; the latter is the only DVD to be released in its theatrical 1.66:1 widescreen aspect ratio, however, it is simply cropping the 1.33:1 version. The short is also on the Disney Animation Collection Volume 7 DVD (1.33:1). On November 5, 2013, the 30th Anniversary Edition of this short was released on DVD and for the first time on Blu-ray; however, it was further cropped to 1.78:1 widescreen and featured a heavy use of noise reduction. Various other shorts were included in the DVD.

See also
 List of Christmas films
 List of ghost films
 List of A Christmas Carol adaptations
 Mickey Mouse (film series)

Notes

External links
 
 
 
 

1980s children's animated films
1980s Christmas films
1980s Disney animated short films
1980s English-language films
1983 fantasy films
1983 animated films
1983 comedy-drama films
1983 short films
American animated featurettes
American children's animated comedy films
American children's animated fantasy films
American Christmas films
Animated Christmas films
Animated crossover films
Animated films based on novels
Animated films set in London
Films based on A Christmas Carol
Films directed by Burny Mattinson
Films scored by Irwin Kostal
Films set in the 1840s
Films set in the Victorian era
Mickey Mouse short films
Scrooge McDuck
Films with screenplays by Burny Mattinson
Films produced by Burny Mattinson